Eleutherodactylus cavernicola is a species of frog in the family Eleutherodactylidae endemic to Jamaica. Its natural habitats are subtropical or tropical moist lowland forest and caves.
It is threatened by habitat loss.

References

cavernicola
Endemic fauna of Jamaica
Amphibians of Jamaica
Amphibians described in 1954
Taxonomy articles created by Polbot